Mesjapyx is a genus of diplurans in the family Japygidae.

Species
 Mesjapyx afrinus Silvestri, 1948
 Mesjapyx immsi (Silvestri, 1931)
 Mesjapyx silvestris (Carpenter, 1916)

References

Diplura